Podcast Movement (PM) is an annual conference for the podcast industry. It is one of the largest gatherings of participants in podcasting, with over 3,000 attendees in 2019. Described as  "for podcasters, by podcasters", it focuses on collaboration and networking among attendees, in addition to education and encouragement.

The 2017 conference was split into different tracks covering different aspects of podcasting such as Creation, Technical, Industry, Monetization, Marketing, Society, Culture & Advocacy, Audio Drama, and Broadcasters Meets Podcasters. Featured speakers have included Sarah Koenig, Aisha Tyler, Kevin Smith, Pat Flynn, Guy Raz, Dan Carlin, Terry Gross, Alex Blumberg, Roman Mars, Marc Maron, Glynn Washington, Mark Cuban and Aaron Mahnke. Exhibitors include software & service providers, gear and equipment manufacturers. Attendees are made up of amateur and professional podcasters, as well as media professionals working for radio broadcasters, podcast networks, technology companies and advertisers

History 
The first conference in 2014 was funded via a Kickstarter campaign. The target goal of $11,000 was met within the first 24 hours. 
In 2019, the organizers announced an additional annual event called 'Podcast Movement Evolutions,' the first of which is scheduled to take place in Los Angeles in February 2020.

Controversy 
On August 25, 2022 the official Twitter account of Podcast Movement apologized for hosting the Daily Wire, a conservative podcasting website co-owned by Ben Shapiro. The organization alleged at least one attendee "felt pain" by Shapiro's presence. On September 8th of the same year, they apologized to Mr. Shapiro via Twitter for their previous reaction toward him and his company.

References 

Conferences in the United States
Podcasting companies